Hong Son-long (born 27 May 1941) is a Taiwanese athlete. He competed in the men's high jump at the 1968 Summer Olympics.

References

1941 births
Living people
Athletes (track and field) at the 1968 Summer Olympics
Taiwanese male high jumpers
Olympic athletes of Taiwan
Place of birth missing (living people)